Dennis M. Wilson (August 10, 1950–September 11, 2020) was a politician from the U.S. state of Kansas.

Born in Kansas City, Missouri, Wilson made his political career in the suburbs of that city. While living in Overland Park, Kansas, he was elected to the Kansas House of Representatives from the 29th district in 1995, serving four years there. In 2005, he rejoined the legislature, representing the 37th district in the Kansas State Senate from 2005 to 2008. He declined to run for re-election to the Senate in 2008, and was succeeded by fellow Republican Jeff Colyer.

Wilson also worked as the director of the Kansas State Lottery and as a county official for Johnson County, Kansas. A section of U.S. Highway 69 in Johnson County was named after Wilson in 2021.

References

Republican Party Kansas state senators
Republican Party members of the Kansas House of Representatives
Politicians from Kansas City, Missouri
Politicians from Overland Park, Kansas
20th-century American politicians
21st-century American politicians
1950 births
2020 deaths